Rajinder Singh Rai, better known by his stage name Panjabi MC, is a British-Indian recording artist, rapper, producer and DJ. He is best known for the worldwide 2002 bhangra hit "Mundian To Bach Ke", which sold 10 million copies worldwide, making it one of the best-selling singles of all time. Among other songs, he gained acclaim with the 2003 release "Jogi". AllMusic has called him "one of the most prominent names in bhangra".

Career
Rajinder Singh adopted his stage name from the Punjabi language he used in the music he plays and raps. "One of [his] main goals is to fuse the two worlds [of Bhangra and hip hop]."

Nachural Records signed Panjabi MC following a remix of Kuldeep Manak's "Ghariah Milan De". Although the single was taken off the market, Panjabi MC continued making records. Another successful release was "Mundian To Bach Ke" ("Beware of the Boys") (1998; it first appeared on the album Legalised) which mixed the theme of the TV series Knight Rider with Bhangra. An underground hit on the internet, it was picked up by the German record label Superstar Recordings, and became a hit record in Germany and across Europe, including the UK. A version of this recording in 2003 featured American rapper Jay-Z titled "Beware of the Boys".

His work, particularly the early singles and the "Mundian To Bach Ke" remix with Jay-Z, brought Bhangra music genre to a global audience via the BBC. He continues to produce and remix music. In 2004, he made music called "Mirza" and mixed this song with Turkish singer Mustafa Sandal's "Isyankar", but they did not release the mixed version.

His album Indian Timing was released in 2008. His music video "Snake Charmer" was screened at Deejay Ra's music video night in Toronto at the FILMI festival, North America's longest running South Asian film festival.

The remix of "Mundian To Bach Ke" with Jay-Z appears on the soundtrack of the 2021 Netflix film The White Tiger.

Sampling
On Indian Timing, Panjabi MC uses vocal samples from Ofra Haza "Im Nin'Alu". He used "Planet 
Rock" ("Pyar Wich (Planet Rock Remix)" on the album Legalised) before Afrika Bambaataa recorded "Indian Planet Rock". On "Jatt Ho Giya Sharabee", Panjabi MC uses the theme music from the TV show Magnum, P.I.  "Mundian To Bach Ke" (along with the subsequent remix version featuring Jay-Z, "Beware of the Boys") uses the bassline from the television show Knight Rider.

Television work
In 2001, Panjabi MC made his Canadian premiere at the Payal Banquet Hall in Mississauga (Ontario). Deejay Ra hosted a TV special covering the event entitled "The Bhangramentary", which was aired on the Asian Television Network (ATN).  His single, "Jatt Ho Giya Sharabee", from Beware, was featured on the television show Heroes (episode 2, Don't Look Back, which aired 2 October 2006).  The single "Mundian To Bach Ke" was featured in an episode of Queer as Folk and in the 2002 movie Bend It Like Beckham. It also features in the BAFTA-nominated film The White Tiger in 2020. The song "Yaaran Kollon Sikh Kuriye" was featured in the show Wild Boyz as a music video. Panjabi MC has appeared on Top of the Pops, from which the video to "Mundian To Bach Ke" began to appear on music channels across the globe.

Together with Sukhwinder Singh and Sapna Awasthi, Panjabi MC remixed the popular song "Chaiyya Chaiyya" from the Bollywood film, Dil Se... This song was used as the background during opening credits for the Hollywood movie Inside Man. Their song "Land of Five Rivers", used as a theme song for the WWE wrestler The Great Khali, features on Voices: WWE The Music, Vol. 9.

Discography

Studio albums
 Souled Out (1993, Nachural Records)
 Another Sell Out (1994, Nachural Records)
 100% Proof (1995, Nachural Records)
 Grass Roots (1996, Nachural Records)
 Magic Desi (1996)
 Legalised (1998, Nachural Records)
 Dhol Jageroo Da (2001, Moviebox)
 Desi (2002, Moviebox)
 Indian Breaks (2003, Compagnia Nuove Indye)
 Mundian To Bach Ke (2003, Compagnia Nuove Indye)
 The Album (German version: Superstar/ Warner; Germany) (French version: Scorpio; France) (UK Version: Instant Karma) (2003)
 Beware (American version of "The Album"; 2003, Sequence)
 Steel Bangle (2005, Moviebox)
 Indian Timing (2008, PMC Records)
 The Raj (2010, PMC Records)
 56 Districts (2019, PMC Records)

Compilation albums
 Illegal (2006, Nupur Audio)
 Sentello II (2004, Korsan Cd)

EPs
 Jatt Ho Gya Sharabi (1996, Nachural Records)
 Mirza Part Two (1997, Nachural Records)
 Switchin' (2000, Moviebox)

Singles

Awards
2003: MTV Europe Music Awards – Best Dance Act – "Panjabi MC"
2003: MOBO Awards – Best UK Act
2003: UK Asian Music Awards – Best Single Bhangra – "Mundian To Bach Ke"
2003: World Music Awards – World's Best Indian Artist
2011: Punjabi Music Awards – Best Sound Recording – "Moorni"
2011: Brit Asia TV Music Awards – Best Single – "Moorni" and Best Asian Music Producer
2018: Brit Asia TV Music Awards – Outstanding Achievement

References

External links
 

1973 births
British people of Punjabi descent
British rappers of Indian descent
English people of Indian descent
Desi musicians
British hip hop DJs
English DJs
English record producers
Hip hop record producers
Living people
Asian Underground musicians
English Sikhs
MTV Europe Music Award winners
World Music Awards winners
Musicians from Coventry
Bhangra (music) musicians